The Reptile World Tour (sometimes: The Reptile Tour) a worldwide concert tour by British Rock musician Eric Clapton in support of his album Reptile. The tour began on February 3, 2001 at London's Royal Albert Hall and ended on December 15, 2001 at the Yokohama Arena in Yokohama. In 2001, Clapton said this was going to be his last major world tour. However, he did perform another world tour in 2011 to support his Clapton album.

Set list
 "Key to the Highway"
 "Reptile"
 "Got You on My Mind"
 "Tears in Heaven"
 "Bell Bottom Blues"
 "Change the World"
 "My Father's Eyes"
 "River of Tears"
 "Going Down Slow"
 "She's Gone"
 "I Want a Little Girl"
 "Badge"
 "(I'm Your) Hoochie Coochie Man"
 "Have You Ever Loved a Woman"
 "Cocaine"
 "Wonderful Tonight"
 "Layla"
 "Sunshine of Your Love"
 "Over the Rainbow"

Sometimes Clapton performed songs like "It's Alright", "Finally Got Myself Together" and "I Ain't Gonna Stand for It" just when The Impressions were included on concert dates. If the vocal group had not appeared on a gig with Clapton, he did not perform the song. For dates in the North American tour, Billy Preston sang Will It Go Round in Circles.

Tour Dates

Cancelled Shows

References

2001 concert tours
Eric Clapton